Navarro is a drama series about a French commissioner that aired on TF1. It was on the air for 18 years.

Plot
Antoine Navarro solves cases as a French police officer in Paris.

Cast 

 Roger Hanin as Commissioner Antoine Navarro (1989-2005)
 Emmanuelle Boidron as Yolande Navarro, Navarro's Daughter (1989-2005)
 Catherine Allégret as Ginette "Ginou" Bouloche (1989-1995 / 1999–2005)
 Françoise Armelle as Gabrielle "Gaby" Laisi (1997-1998)
 Jacques Martial as Inspector Bain-Marie (later lieutenant) (1989-2004)
 Christian Rauth as Inspector René Auquelin (later Lieutenant) (1989-2004)
 Daniel Rialet as Inspector Joseph Blomet (later Lieutenant) (1989-2004)
 Jean-Claude Caron as Inspector Guisseppe Borelli (later Lieutenant) (1994-2005)
 Grace de Capitani as Inspector Laura Marcos (1993)
 Viktor Lazlo as Captain Roussel (2005)
 Jean-Marie Mistral as Officer Christian Martin (1989-2005)
 Marie Fugain as Lieutenant Carole Maudiard (2000-2005)
 Filip Nikolic as Lieutenant Yann Boldec (2001-2005)
 Anthony Dupray as Lieutenant Lucas Paoli (2003-2006)
 Maurice Vaudaux as Superintendent Maurice Waltz (1989-2006)
 Bernard Larmande as Dr. Salvo Carlo (1989-2005)
 Michel Pilorgé as Professor Bloch, CSU (1991-2005)
 Sam Karmann as Detective Chief Inspector François Barrada (later Commissioner) (1989-1993)
 Isabelle Mergault as Miss Lulu (1989-1991)

Guest
 Anne Marivin
 Babsie Steger
 Béatrice Agenin
 Carole Franck
 Corinne Touzet
 Didier Flamand
 Emil Abossolo-Mbo
 Étienne Chicot
 Éva Darlan
 François Marthouret
 François Rollin
 Frédérique Cantrel
 Gianni Giardinelli
 Jacques Boudet
 Jean Benguigui
 Jean-Marie Winling
 Jean-Yves Berteloot
 Joseph Malerba
 Judith El Zein
 Julien Courbey
 Laure Duthilleul
 Liane Foly
 Liliane Rovère
 Marianne Denicourt
 Marie-Christine Adam
 Martine Chevallier
 Michèle Laroque
 Michèle Moretti
 Natacha Amal
 Nicolas Vaude
 Nicole Calfan
 Olivier Martinez
 Pascale Arbillot
 Philippe Bas
 Riton Liebman
 Samir Guesmi
 Thibault de Montalembert
 Yolande Moreau

Episodes

Series 1 (1989)
 La fille d'André (Andre's Daughter)
 Le rouleau ne fait pas le printemps (The Roller Doesn't Make a Summer)
 Fils de périph' (Peripheral wires')
 Folie de flic (Cop Folly)

Series 2 (1990)
 Strip Show
 Barbès de l'aube à l'aurore 
 Mauvaise Action
 Samouraï
 Mort d'une fourmi
 Cimetière des éléphants
 Billets de sang
 Salades russes
 Méprise d'otages

Series 3 (1991)
 Le bal des gringos
 Comme des frères
 Un mort sans avenir 
 Les chasses-neiges
 À L'ami a la mort 
 Enlèvement demandé
 Dans les cordes
 Le collectionneur
 Le clan des clandestins 
 La mariée est en rouge 
 Mort clinique

Series 4 (1992)
 Mort d'un témoin
 Le dernier Casino
 L'étoffe de Navarro
 Les enfants de nulle part 
 Le voisin du dessus

Series 5 (1993)
 L'honneur de Navarro
 Le contrat
 Coupable je présume?
 Froid devant 
 Crime de sang 
 En suivant la caillera
 L'échange
 Un visage d'ange 
 Triste Carnaval
 Les gens de peu

Series 6 (1994)
 Fort Navarro
 Le choix de Navarro 
 Coups bas 
 Femmes en colère

Series 7 (1995) 
 Meurtre d'un salaud
 Sanglante Nostalgie
 Sentiments mortels
 L'ombre d'un père 
 L'encaisseur
 Les chiffonniers de l'aube 
 La trahison de Ginou
 Le fils unique
 Le cimetière des sentiments

Series 8 (1997)
 Regrettable incident
 Une femme à l'index
 Le parfum du danger
 Verdict
 Un mari violent 
 Un bon flic

Series 9 (1998)
 Pleure pas petit homme
 Pas de grève pour le crime 
 La colère de Navarro 
 Secret
 Suicide de flic 
 Avec les loups
 Thomas l'enfant battue

Series 10 (1999) 
 Esclavage moderne
 Bus de nuit
 Sur ma vie 
 L'émeute
 Meurtres en famille

Series 11 (2000)
 Vengeance Aveugle
 Jusqu'au bout de la vie 
 Une fille en flamme 
 Terreur à domicile 
 Promotion macabre 
 Mademoiselle Navarro
 Ne pleurez pas Jeannette 
 La machination

Series 12 (2001)
 Graines de Macadame
 Le parrain
 Délocalisation
 La peau d'un mulet
 Zéro pointé
 Police Racket

Series 13 (2002)
 Chute d'un ange
 Marchand d'homme
 Flics et Trafics 
 La revenante
 Sortie autorisée
 Voleur sans défense
 Une Affaire Brûlante

Series 14 (2003)
 Fascination
 Le bourreau de l'ombre 
 La foire au sentiment
 Ainsi soit-il

Series 15 (2004)
 Manipulation
 Double meurtres 
 Escort blues
 Mortelle violence 
 Une femme au abois
 La mort un dimanche
 Au cœur du volcan 
 Jour de colère

Series 16 (2005)
 Blessure profonde
 Adolescence brisée
 L'âme en vrac 
 Disparition 
 Famille blessée

Spin offs
 Miss Navarro (2005) (Mademoiselle Navarro)
 Squad Navarro (Brigade Navarro) (2006-2008)

References

French crime drama television series
1989 French television series debuts
TF1 television dramas
2007 French television series endings